The Refreshments may refer to:

 The Refreshments (Swedish band)
 The Refreshments (American band)